Konjum Salangai is a 1962 Indian Tamil-language musical dance film directed by M. V. Raman. The film stars Gemini Ganesan, Savitri, R. S. Manohar and Kumari Kamala. It was released on 14 January 1962. The film was dubbed into Telugu as Muripinche Muvvalu. This film is the Indian Tamil cinema's one and only Tamil film to be entirely shot and released in Technicolor.

Plot 

A king Parthiban gifts a rare anklet (salangai) to a dancer Aparajita. She incurs the displeasure of people who do not like a dancer having a hold over the kingdom. She begets the king's son, Amarendran and hands him over to a priest along with the anklet. She dies after extracting a promise from him that the truth will be revealed at an appropriate time. Amarendran grows into a strong young man interested in music, dancing and martial arts. One day, a special festival is arranged and the priest thinks it is time to reveal the secret. He carries the anklet in a wooden box, and while crossing a river in floods, he loses the anklet. It is found by Amarendran, who also rescues a dancer Mallika from the floods. He hands over the anklet to the king. Amarendran also happens to meet a singer Shantha, who falls in love with him. Mallika impresses the king, is subsequently appointed the court dancer and gets the anklet as a gift. In another dance competition, Mallika dances with Kamavalli (Kushalakumari) and the anklet gets stolen due to a conspiracy. The villain Nagadevan lusts after Mallika. How Amarendran and Shantha are united forms the rest of the story.

Cast 
Credits adapted from the film's songbook:

Gemini Ganesan as Amarendran
Savithri as Shantha
Manohar as Nagadevan
Kumari Kamala as Mallika
Kusalakumari as Kamavalli
S. Peer Mohamed as Panchanatham
S. V. Ramdas as Parthiban
K. Sarangapani as Nandhi

C. P. Kittan as Kalamegam
Rushyendramani as Shantha's Mother
T. P. Muthulakshmi as Alankaram
P. S. Gnanam as Mallika's Mother
V. P. S. Mani as Mari
Kumari Madhuri as Aparajitha 
V. Seetharaman as Mama
Rathnam as Anjalai

Supporting cast
T. V. Sethuraman, Gemini Balu, Socrates Thangaraj, Kumari Sasi, Stunt Raji, K. S. Manian

Production 
Konjum Salangai was the 100th film for Savitri as an actress. It was shot in 41 different sets at three studios Newtone Studios and Narasu Studios in Madras, and Raman Studio in Bombay. It was processed in London under the direct supervision of Raman.

Soundtrack 
The music was composed by S. M. Subbaiah Naidu, while the lyrics for songs were written by Kannadasan, Ku. Ma. Balasubramaniam, and V. Seetharaman. One of the songs from this film "Singara Velane" was well received and provided breakthrough for S. Janaki who sang the song, Nadaswaram portions for the song was played by Karaikurichi Arunachalam. Regarding the recording of the song, the singing by Janaki was recorded at the Raman Studio in Bombay, while the nadaswaram portions were recorded in Madras, and the two tracks were mixed. The song is based on Abheri raga. Another song "Orumuraiyudan" is based on Bilahari raga.
The dance sequence by Kumari Kamala for the song "Kaana Kann Kodi" which is a Ragamaliga, was pictured at the shrines in Chidambaram, Sri Rangam, Madurai, Thiruchendur and Sri Villiputhur. When the 78 RPM record was released before the release of the film, the song included Swaras and had a duration of 6:14 minutes. But in the film, the swaras was cut resulting in a short duration of 5:22 mins. A link to the full version is given under External links.

Release and reception 
Konjum Salangai was released in India on 14 January 1962, coinciding with Pongal. It was also released outside India, with the original having subtitles in more than 22 languages by a British company. It was also dubbed into other languages and received a fair amount of notice from critics. The film marked a record for being the first Tamil film to be exhibited in Poland with a dubbed version. In a review dated 28 January 1962, The Indian Express said, "Konjum Salangai, the first Technicolor feature film of South India is a revealing experience that even our technicians can bring out in a film the rich, glossy sheen and pleasing tonal gradations comparable with that of any Technicolor product made abroad."

References

External links 

1960s dance films
1960s Tamil-language films
1962 films
1962 musical films
Films directed by M. V. Raman
Films scored by S. M. Subbaiah Naidu
Indian dance films
Indian musical films